Ronnachai Sayomchai (born 14 September 1966) is a Thai retired footballer. He is currently assistant head coach Thai League 1 club of Port.  He is a former player of Thai Port F.C., and in 1998 he was the Thai League's top scorer with 23 goals for the season. This record for Thai league stands for 14 years until Teerasil Dangda broke it in 2012 with 25 goals. Ronnachai also played in Malaysia for Pahang FA.

Ronnachai was an international player with Thailand.

References

Ronnachai Sayomchai
Ronnachai Sayomchai
Living people
Ronnachai Sayomchai
Sri Pahang FC players
Gamba Osaka players
Footballers at the 1990 Asian Games
1966 births
Ronnachai Sayomchai
Ronnachai Sayomchai
Southeast Asian Games medalists in football
Thai expatriate sportspeople in Japan
Association football forwards
Competitors at the 1987 Southeast Asian Games
Ronnachai Sayomchai
Ronnachai Sayomchai